Dancing the Whole Way Home is the fourth studio album release by Swedish Singer-songwriter Miss Li. The album debuted and peaked at No. 8 on the Swedish Albums Chart on 10 April 2009. The song "Bourgeois Shangri-la" was featured in the 2009 Apple iPod commercial, and the song contains a sample from "Count Me In" by Gary Lewis & the Playboys.

Track listing
 "I Heard of a Girl" – 2:45
 "Dirty Old Man" – 3:02
 "True Love Stalker" – 3:14
 "Polythene Queen" – 3:34
 "Is This the End" – 3:28
 "Dancing the Whole Way Home" – 2:49
 "Stuck in the Sand" – 3:45
 "A Daughter or a Son" – 4:30
 "Bourgeois Shangri-La" – 2:48
 "The Boy in the Fancy Suit" – 3:12
 "Stupid Girl" – 4:38

References

2009 albums
Miss Li albums